Robert Ernest Briggs (20 November 1883 – 6 July 1955) was an Australian rules footballer who played with Fitzroy and St Kilda in the Victorian Football League (VFL).

Football
Briggs, who was from Port Rovers and Williamstown originally, made eight appearances for Fitzroy in the 1909 VFL season. He didn't miss a single game in 1910 and was Fitzroy's leading goal-kicker with 30 goals. While with Williamstown, he played 24 games and kicked 63 games in 1907 and 1908, including the premiership victory over West Melbourne at East Melbourne Cricket Ground in 1907. He kicked 59 goals in 1908, the highest tally ever recorded to that date by a Williamstown player. Briggs was also the first Williamstown player to kick 10 goals in a match, which he did against North Melbourne at Arden Street in round 16, 1908.

Notes

External links

1883 births
1955 deaths
Australian rules footballers from Melbourne
Australian Rules footballers: place kick exponents
Fitzroy Football Club players
St Kilda Football Club players
Williamstown Football Club players
People from South Melbourne